Zaj Kan-e Sofla (also Romanized as Zāj Kān-e Soflá, Zāchgān-e Soflá, Zāchkān-e Soflá, Zadzhkan-Sufla, and Zājkān Sufla; also known as Zāj Kān-e Pā’īn) is a village in Kuhgir Rural District, Tarom Sofla District, Qazvin County, Qazvin Province, Iran. At the 2006 census its population was 92, in 22 families.

References 

Populated places in Qazvin County